Kippari may refer to:

 Ray Kippari, a Canadian professional darts player
 Kippari (magazine), a Finnish boat magazine